The 2008–09 Montenegrin Cup was the third season of the Montenegrin knockout football tournament. The winner of the tournament received a berth in the second qualifying round of the 2009–10 UEFA Europa League. The defending champions were Mogren, who beat Budućnost in the final of the 2007–08 competition. The competition featured 30 teams. It started on 17 September 2008 and ended with the final on 13 May 2009.

First round
The 14 matches were played on 17 and 18 September 2008.

|}

Second round
The first legs were played on 22 October and the second legs were played on 5 November 2008.

|}

Quarter-finals
The first legs were played on 26 November and second on 10 December 2008.

Summary

|}

First legs

Second legs

Semi-finals
The first legs were played on 15 April and second on 29 April 2009.

Summary

|}

First legs

Second legs

Final

References

External links
Montenegrin Cup 2008-2009 (pages 57-62) at Football Association of Montenegro's official site
Montenegrin Cup 2008-2009 at Soccerway
Montenegrin Cup 2008-2009 at RSSSF

Montenegrin Cup seasons
Montenegrin Cup, 2008-09
Cup